You Can't Always Tell is a 1915 American silent short film directed by and starring  William Garwood in the lead role with Violet Mersereau. It is one of several short films that Garwood and Mersereau starred in together and Garwood directed.

Cast
 William Garwood as Harrington Spencer - Reporter
 Violet Mersereau as Violet
 Edna Hunter
 Frederick Sullivan
 Ben Walsh

References

External links

American silent short films
American black-and-white films
1915 films
Universal Pictures short films
1910s American films